The Echuca United Football and Netball Club Inc. (EUFNC) known as Echuca United Eagles was formed from the merger of Echuca South and Echuca East Football Netball Clubs.

It is affiliated with the Murray Football Netball League, Shepparton and Districts Junior Football League and Goulburn Campaspe Junior Football League.

The Echuca United Football and Netball Club is a Good Sports accredited club. The club is smoke-free and the changerooms have been alcohol free since 2001.

It is a family orientated, safe and enjoyable place for all ages to be involved.

Club history 
The Echuca United Football and Netball Club Inc. was formed in 1994 with the merger of the Echuca South and Echuca East Football Netball Clubs and competed in the Northern and Echuca League until 1996 wearing brown and gold vertical striped jumpers known as the Hawks. In 1990 the Northern Districts FL merged with the Echuca FL to form the Northern and Echuca Football League. 

When the Northern and Echuca Football League disbanded at the end of 1996, the club joined the Murray Football League for the commencement of the 1997 season and were required to change their playing stripe colours to the blue and gold Eagles jumpers worn today because of the Barooga Hawks (already in the Murray League). The decision was made to become the Echuca United Eagles. The club used the same design as the West Coast Eagles in the AFL. At the commencement of the 2002 season, new jumpers were purchased, keeping with the blue and gold colours, but a new Eagles head design was adopted.

Since the formation of the club, many people have worked hard to make it a family orientated, safe and enjoyable place for all ages to be involved. Our sponsors are visible at all levels and are encouraged to actively participate in the club’s future.

Echuca East Football Club (1890 to 1993)
The club was established in May, 1890, at Swanell's Hotel, Echuca and they decided to wear black and white jumpers. They merged with Echuca South Football Club to form Echuca United Football Club in 1994.

 Echuca South Football Club (1952 to 1993)
The club was established in 1952 and competed in the Echuca Football League from 1952 to 1989, then in the Northern & Echuca Football League from 1990 to 1993.

Game statistics

Premierships

Reference:

Football Awards

Best & Fairest

1994 - R Couchman
1995 - P Pellegrino
1996 - C Day
1997 - J Hatfield
1998 - P Taylor
1999 - C Day
2000 - B Henderson
2001 - D Dalziel
2002 - D Dalziel
2003 - B Pannam
2004 - D Dalziel
2005 - T McMaster
2006 - A Baker
2007 - L Jones
2008 - D Hueston
2009 - D Hueston
2010 - R Priest
2011 - D Hueston
2012 - S Beattie
2013 - F Priest
2014 - D Moon
2015 - D Hueston
2016 - D Hueston
2017 - C Wanganeen 
2018 - N Denahy
2019 - J Mellington 
2020 - Covid-19 Outbreak
2021 - M Lias

Reference:

AFL Players
The following Echuca United FC footballers played senior AFL football or were selected in the AFL draft.
1997 - Michael Braun

Netball internationals

 Caitlyn Nevins

References

External links
 
 https://echucaunitedfnc.com.au/

Murray Football League clubs
Australian rules football clubs in Victoria (Australia)
Echuca-Moama
1994 establishments in Australia
Sports clubs established in 1994
Australian rules football clubs established in 1994
Netball teams in Victoria (Australia)